Martin Grasegger (born 10 January 1989) is an Austrian professional association football player who plays for ASKÖ Oedt in the fourth-tier OÖ Liga.

Club career
On 8 August 2020, he joined SKU Amstetten on a one-season contract.

Honours
Pasching
Austrian Cup: 2012–13

References

External links

1989 births
Living people
Austrian footballers
Austria youth international footballers
Association football defenders
SV Ried players
FC Juniors OÖ players
SKN St. Pölten players
SC Austria Lustenau players
FC Blau-Weiß Linz players
SKU Amstetten players
Austrian Football Bundesliga players
2. Liga (Austria) players
Austrian Regionalliga players